Trusler may refer to:

 Trusler Sports Complex, located in Emporia, Kansas
 Peter Trusler (born 1954), an Australian artist
 Allan Trusler (born 1933), a former Australian rules footballer
 Wally Trusler (1941–2008), a former Australian rules footballer
 John Trusler (1735–1820), an English divine